Global Underground 027: Danny Howells, Miami is a DJ mix album in the Global Underground series, compiled and mixed by Danny Howells. It is a retrospective mix of Danny Howell's halloween party at Club Space in downtown Miami. The album peaked at #14 on the Billboard Top Electronic Albums.

With Nu Breed and 24/7 mixes, Danny was already a key part of the GU family, but had surprisingly never released in the City series until this point. Trust Mr Howells to safely represent the party city of Miami in fine style when finally asked to do one then.

This mix demonstrates how far the grassroots sound played by Global Underground’s protégés had moved from the classic progressive era that spawned them, into a lighter but devastatingly funky take on house. Howells is the master of this, and the mix evokes one of his famous all night South Beach sessions perfectly.

Track listing

Disc one
Subway - Thermal – 6:12
Tomas Barford - Light Shine (Original Mix) – 4:38
AN-2 - Road Through the Rain (Steve Bug Mix) – 5:55
Âme - Shiro – 7:43
Sneaker Pimps - Post Modern Sleaze (The Salt City Orchestra Nightclub Mix) – 7:27
Break 3000 & Adam Kroll - Discotronic – 4:45
Tantra - Hills of Katmandu – 5:27
Nique - Mission (Original Mix) – 4:53
Olaf Pozsgay - Like a Virgin (Original) – 5:23
Silicone Soul - Les Nocturnes – 6:55
Mimosa - End of Me (Jazzy Dub Mix) – 5:38
Atomphunk - Boogie Down (Knee Deep Mix) – 4:52
Bent - Exercise 5 – 5:51

Disc two
Dennis DeSantis - Thin Air – 4:26
Codebase - Seek and Destroy – 2:48
Dennis DeSantis - Hiatus – 5:05
Sid LeRock - Bull Dozer – 6:19
Steve Barnes - Cosmic Sandwich – 3:02
Wighnomy Brothers - Wurz + Blosse – 3:58
Mateo Murphy - Latin Lover – 5:04
Boogie Drama - Stalker's Groove – 5:03
Drama Society - Crying Hero (Tiga Remix) – 4:17
Bobby Peru - Blood Money – 4:31
Unit 4 - Bodydub (Tiefschwarz Remix) – 6:45
Solid Gold Playaz - Le Soul Afrique – 3:53
Ashtrax - Freeload (Free Love) – 4:14
Bryan Zentz - Redfield (Electric Gender Mix) – 4:44
Greens Keepers - Keep It Down (Radio Slave Dub) – 6:14
Throbbing Gristle - Hot on the Heels of Love (Ratcliffe Remix) – 7:48

References

External links 

Global Underground
2005 compilation albums